Aach, also von Aach, is a German surname derived from the toponym Aach. Notable people of the name include:

 Hans Günther Aach (1919–1999), German botanist
 Herb Aach (1923–1985), American painter and writer

German-language surnames